San Agustín is a municipality located in the province of Teruel, Aragon, Spain. It lies just east of the Autovía A-23 60 km south east of the town of Teruel and 70 km north west of Sagunt.  According to the National Institute of Statistics, the municipality had a population of 155 inhabitants in 2013.

In literature, San Augustin is mentioned by James A. Michener in his book, Iberia. As a young man, Michener had landed at Burriana as a part of a ship's crew and taken the train to Teruel.  Re-visiting the area in the 1960s, Michener found only small improvements in the standard of living.

References

Municipalities in the Province of Teruel